The deep anterior cervical lymph nodes are found near the middle cricothyroid ligament and the trachea.

Lymphatics of the head and neck